is the official mascot of Japan's public broadcaster NHK, appearing in several 30-second stop-motion interstitial sketches, which are shown as station identification in between the channel's programming.

DOMO
Domo-kun first appeared in short stop-motion sketches on December 22, 1998 to mark the 10th anniversary of NHK's satellite broadcasting.
The name "Domo" was acquired during the second episode of his show, in which a TV announcer said , which is a greeting that can be translated as "Well, hello there!", but which can also be interpreted as "Hello, Domo", and thus is a convenient pun (dajare). The kun suffix on "Domo-kun", the name used to describe the character in the Japanese versions, is a Japanese honorific often used with young males.

Development
Tsuneo Gōda directs Domo episodes using stop motion animation. Gōda says that, by using this process, one can "create a work filled with feeling".

Characters
Domo, the main character, is a brown, furry monster with a large, sawtoothed mouth that is locked wide open. His favorite food is nikujaga, a Japanese meat and potato stew. According to a Tokyopop press release of the Domo comic book, Domo "communicates sotto voce with a verve that only his friends can understand." Clint Bickham, the writer of the Domo comic book, said that to him Domo's expression is "a sort of cheery wonderment. Like when a kid wakes to a room full of presents on Christmas day." While Domo's face has variants, to Bickham most of his expressions have "an underlying sense of fascination." Domo is known to pass gas repeatedly when nervous or upset. He also sweats when nervous.

Mr. Usaji is a wise old rabbit who has lived in a cave for decades, loves to watch television and drink astringent green tea. Mr. Usaji is not into any "new" materials, and does not own a telephone. In terms of fashion, Mr. Usaji focuses on materials instead of shapes. Mr. Usaji's favorite food is carrots, and his least favorite food is "something that is meaningless."

Also in the cave live two bats, a mother named Maya ( in the Japanese version) and her child Mario ( in the Japanese version). Maya suffers from alcoholism; her favorite foods are seasonal while her least favorite food is alcohol. Mario's favorite food is Japanese-style tomato spaghetti, while his least favorite food is shiitake mushrooms.

The other main character in the shorts is a weasel girl named Tashanna ( in the Japanese version). Tashanna, 17 years old, is a weasel who aspires to be a fashion stylist or model in Tokyo and is always using technology (televisions, mobile phones, and cameras). In the Japanese version, she ends her sentences with "chi" (ち). She has not had a boyfriend in ten years and she is seeking a platonic boyfriend. She has a passion for bidding in auctions, but she gives up by the end. Tashanna's favorite food is apricot and mint tarts, and her least favorite food is sea urchin. The Japanese name originates from the word  of digital broadcasting.

Hee and Haw are pixie twins from a flower. Domo is the only individual who can see them.

The Fox Trio consists of Esther, and Fox Boy. Esther, the youngest member, enjoys producing crocodile tears, plotting schemes, and causing havoc. Fox Boy, having a quiet demeanor, converses with Domo and Bear Boy and prefers to read.

, a large and powerful bear, feels too hungry to take advantage of his strength.

The Ghost randomly appears and disappears.

In other media
A stop-motion children's television series based on the character, titled Domo TV, was co-produced by Nickelodeon and NHK. It was first announced in 2006 and premiered in October 2008 on Nicktoons Network. It continued to air until February 2009. Later that year, Nickelodeon also aired a series of 7-Eleven advertisements featuring Domo. Domo TV was released to DVD on July 1, 2009 along with every Domo commercial that had been produced to that date.
Tokyopop published an original English-language manga based on the character titled Domo: The Manga in the United States and Canada. Clint Bickham created the stories and crafted the dialog; Bickham said that he did "pretty much everything short of drawing it." The stories were drawn by Priscilla Hamby (aka Rem), Lindsay Cibos, Jared Hodges, Sonia Leong, Maximo V. Lorenzo (in the special 7-11 edition only) and Erie Horita. Bickham decided to use a series of short stories instead of one long story to "recreate the feel of the original series," "so hopefully, reading a story from the manga will feel the same as watching an episode of the show." Bickham said that writing the stories became entertaining when he "got into the Domo mindset." The writer said that Domo's thoughts do not need to be expressed in words as they are "always very simple and innocent." Bickham added that sometimes other characters speak for him. Bickham said that the Domo: the Manga stories "are driven by situations instead of dialogue." To prepare for writing the series, Bickham watched each episode multiple times; Bickham intended to "get a feel for the characters so that the jump from stop-motion to manga would be as seamless as possible." He added that "more than anything, I had to have fun doing it. I don't think you can create a good Domo story without fun."
On February 5, 2014, Domo celebrated its 15th anniversary with Domo Hollywood e Iku! (Domo Goes to Hollywood!), a television special which was premiered on March 28, 2014.
In September 2015, the first music compilation based on Domo, Domo Loves Chiptune, was released on iTunes, Amazon, and all major music streaming services. The compilation features top artists in the Chiptune genre such Anamanaguchi and Disasterpeace. A Domo Loves Christmas compilation was released in November 2015.
Domo became well known outside Japan through a mock public service announcement that circulated on the Internet depicting Domos chasing a kitten with the words stating: "Every time you masturbate... God kills a kitten." An article from ICv2 stated: "This phony PSA is quite out of character with Domo's image in Japan."
Domo has 5 video games on the DSiWare on the Nintendo DSi Shop application for the Nintendo DSi.  The 5 games are Crash-Course Domo, Hard-Hat Domo, Rock-n-Roll Domo, Pro-Putt Domo and White-Water Domo. The Game Boy Advance game Domo-kun no Fushigi Terebi also features Domo-kun. On Facebook, Domo is featured in the social game Planet Domo.

References

External links

 Official NHK Domo website 
 Meaning of Domo 
 Domonation at Veoh

Film and television memes
Internet memes
Fictional monsters
Television mascots
NHK
Mascots introduced in 1998